2002 Raghunath Temple bombings  refers to two fidayeen attacks in 2002 on the Raghunath Temple in Jammu in India.  Built by Maharaja Ranbir Singh in 1860, the Raghunath temple is dedicated to Hindu God Rama.

March attack
The first attack occurred on 30 March 2002 when two suicide bombers attacked the temple. Eleven persons including three security personnel were killed and 20 were injured. The attack occurred around 10:20 AM when the muslim terrorists arrived and fired at the guards killing them on the spot.  They then stormed the temple, threw a grenade and fired indiscriminately at the worshippers.  After expending his ammunition one of the attackers who was wearing a suicide vest blew himself up. Then Minister of State for External Affairs of India, Omar Abdullah, blamed Pakistan for the terrorist attacks on the Raghunath temple in Jammu and ruled out withdrawing troops from the border, saying Islamabad had done nothing to warrant it.

November attack
The fidayeen suicide squad attacked the temple second time on 24 November 2002 when two suicide bombers stormed the temple and killed fourteen devotees and injured 45 others. Witnesses said terrorists hurled grenades and fired indiscriminately on the heavily guarded Raghunath temple. India blamed a Pakistan-based militant group, Lashkar-e-Taiba, for the attack.  Deputy Prime Minister Lal Krishna Advani of India blamed the recent release by the government of Pakistan of the chief of the Lashkar-e-Taiba, Hafiz Muhammad Saeed for the attack.

The personnel of Central Reserve Police Force Yatindra Nath Rai, Assistant Commandant, Dev Singh, Head Constable, E.G. Rao, Head Constable, T.A.Singh, Constable, and Late K.K. Pandey, Constable displayed conspicuous gallantry, courage and devotion to duty of a high order. Late K K Pandey was posthumously awarded President's Police Medal for Gallantry. Yatindra Nath Rai, Dev Singh, E.G.Rao and T.A. Singh were awarded Police Medal for Gallantry.

References

External links
In pictures: Kashmir temple attack, BBC, 220-11-25
Website of the Temple

21st-century mass murder in India
Mass murder in 2002
Suicide bombings in India
Murder–suicides in Asia
Improvised explosive device bombings in India
Massacres in Jammu and Kashmir
2000s in Jammu and Kashmir
Terrorist incidents in India in 2002
Attacks on religious buildings and structures in India
Mass shootings in India
Massacres in religious buildings and structures
March 2002 events in India
November 2002 events in India
2002 mass shootings in Asia
2002 murders in India
Building bombings in India
Islamic terrorist incidents in 2002
Violence against Hindus in India